John Elliott, RIBA, (26 October 1936 – 13 September 2010) was a British architect, who planned and designed luxury hotels and resorts. Born in Portsmouth, England, he was known principally for his contribution in the Middle East and designing 7 star hotel Emirates Palace in Abu Dhabi, United Arab Emirates.

Biography

Education 
John Elliott (Richard John Anthony Elliott), was born in Portsmouth, England. After leaving home at the age of 15, he travelled around Europe before winning a scholarship at the Architectural Association School of Architecture in London. Upon graduating, he took a short course in product design at the Central School of Art, before winning a prestigious Finnish government scholarship and finishing his post graduate studies at the Institute of Technology in Helsinki, Finland.

Early career 
After Finland he moved to Sweden where he spent three years in the office of Ralph Erskine. His years in Sweden and Finland had a profound influence on his design approach to the practice of architecture, and it was this practical experience that started a lifetime of wide angle focus on design.
In 1967, John became the first official town planner of Abu Dhabi, where his specialisation in the Arabian peninsula began. Initially involved with the first developments of Abu Dhabi, John had a close working relationship with Sheikh Zayed bin Sultan Al Nahyan (1918–2004), ruler of Abu Dhabi and President of the United Arab Emirates (1971–2004).

His work later took him to Saudi Arabia designing projects such as the King Abdulaziz University in Jeddah and consulting for the town planning of Jeddah and Riyadh for the royal family.

Sultan of Brunei 
In addition to architecture, John also worked in interior design, as managing partner of Dale Keller & Associates' London Office. Here, he designed a 3 million square meter stately palace commissioned by the Sultan of Brunei.

Hong Kong 
He moved to Dale Keller & Associate's Hong Kong office, and was involved in several new hotels in China and other parts of the Far East. John stayed in Hong Kong for 13 years and began working with Wimberly Allison Tong & Goo's founder, George J. "Pete" Wimberly.

WATG 
In 1991, John moved back to the UK as founder member and managing director of Wimberly Allison Tong & Goo's (WATG) London office. He became a member of the board of directors and senior vice-president, specialising in Middle East projects.

Personal life 
John Elliott had four children, two from his first marriage to Lisbet Frolich, Timo and Maja, and two children from his marriage to Erika Grohmann, Kelsey and Yolande. John and Erika raised Kelsey and Yolande in Hong Kong before moving back to the UK, where they lived in Sandbanks, Dorset. Two years later they moved to their 1930s Art Deco home in London, which John spent several years remodelling.

Completed projects

Architecture 
Emirates Palace, Abu Dhabi, United Arab Emirates
One&Only Royal Mirage, Dubai, United Arab Emirates
Hilton 2000, Ras Al Khaimah, United Arab Emirates
The World Resort, Dubai, United Arab Emirates
Virgin safari resort, Masai Mara, Kenya
Mövenpick Hotels & Resorts Dead Sea Resort & Spa, Jordan
Jumeirah Beach Residence, Dubai, United Arab Emirates
Private Palaces, Al Ain, United Arab Emirates
Shangri-La Hotels and Resorts Resort, Oman, Muscat
Sheraton Hotels and Resorts Abu Soma, Soma Bay, Egypt
Mövenpick Hotels & Resorts El Gouna, Egypt
InterContinental Hotel Amman, Amman, Jordan
Grand Hyatt Amman, Amman, Jordan
Aqaba Beach Resort, Aqaba, Jordan
Marina Village Ayla Oasis Resort, Aqaba, Jordan
Legoland, Windsor, United Kingdom
Denia Marriott La Sella Golf Resort & Spa, Denia, Spain
Hyatt Regency La Manga Golf Resort, Spain
Hilton International Resort, Mauritius
St. Gallen, Switzerland
Military Hospital, Abu Dhabi, United Arab Emirates
Three National Clinics, Abu Dhabi, United Arab Emirates
King Abdulaziz University, Jeddah, Kingdom of Saudi Arabia
University of Calabar, Nigeria
Vilamoura, Algave, Portugal
Villa Gardelius, Stockholm, Sweden
Svapavaara Housing Kiruna HSB Housing, Tibro, Sweden
HSB Housing, Gyttorp, Sweden
Birmingham University Arts Tower, Birmingham, United Kingdom
Coutts & Co Bank, London, United Kingdom
Villa Complex, St.Tropez, France
Phillps Petroleum Villa, Abu Dhabi, United Arab Emirates
Phillips Petroleum Offices, Abu Dhabi, United Arab Emirates

Interior design 
Claridge's, London, United Kingdom (hotel refurbishment)
New Istana Palace, Brunei
Harbour Grand Hotel, North Point, Hong Kong
City Plaza Shopping Centre, Hong Kong

Master planning 
Town Plan, Trebo, Sweden
Town Plan, Gytorp, Sweden
Town Plan, Svapavaara Kiruna, Sweden
Redevelopment of Norwich Station, Norwich, United Kingdom
Town Plan, Abu Dhabi, United Arab Emirates
Town Plan, Al Ain, United Arab Emirates
Town Plan, Um Al Qwain, United Arab Emirates
Shangri La Resort Master Plan, Muscat, Oman
Aftelqaat Resort Master Plan, Muscat, Oman
Bahwan Resort Master Plan, Muscat, Oman
Ayla Oasis Marina Village Urban Plan, Aqaba, Jordan
Excelsior Hotel, Nanjing, China
Mandarin Hotel, Guilin, China
Swiss Hotel, Beijing, China
Sharm Al Ibli Master Plan, Red Sea, Egypt
National Elephant Park Master Plan, Muputo, Mozambique

References 

1936 births
2010 deaths
20th-century English architects
Architects from Portsmouth
Alumni of the Central School of Art and Design